Cecil Owen James Monro (8 April 1883 – 1 May 1966) was an Australian politician and a member of the New South Wales Legislative Assembly between 1932 and 1941 and 1950–53. He was a  member of the United Australia Party and the Liberal Party.

Monro was born in North Sydney, New South Wales. He was the son of a timber merchant, and was educated at The Scots College. He initially worked as a clerk but later owned a real estate agency,  hotels and an auctioneering business. He was involved in community groups in the Cronulla region including  Rotary and the Cronulla Surf Life Saving Club.

After two unsuccessful attempts, Monro was elected to the New South Wales Parliament as the United Australia Party member for Georges River. He defeated the sitting Labor member Ted Kinsella at the 1932 landslide that swept away the government of Jack Lang. Monro retained the seat until the 1941 election, when his defeat by Labor's Arthur Williams contributed to the fall of the conservative coalition government of Bertram Stevens. Monro re-entered parliament as the Liberal member for the new seat of  Sutherland  at the 1950 state election. In a result which had a major influence on the course of Australian history, he defeated the Labor candidate Gough Whitlam. Whitlam subsequently turned his attention to Federal politics and became the Prime Minister of Australia between 1972 and 1975. Monro was defeated at the next election in 1953 and retired from public life. He did not hold a ministerial, party or parliamentary position.

References

 

1883 births
1966 deaths
Liberal Party of Australia members of the Parliament of New South Wales
Members of the New South Wales Legislative Assembly
Australian auctioneers
20th-century Australian politicians